A golden umbrella is a clause in an entrepreneur's contract with their company, typically the CEO or COO, that guarantees a certain payout for the risk they bear in starting the company.

The down-side of a golden umbrella is that angel investors typically do not know the terms of a golden umbrella, thus a CEO may start a company, grow the company, seek first-round and second-round venture capital, and then exit the company with a large pay-out just before the company's market growth takes a downturn due to poor business planning. Hence cheating out on the investors or sponsors

See also
 Golden handshake
 Golden parachute

References

Business terms
Executive compensation